Advanced Placement (AP) Studio Art (also known as AP Art and Design) is a series of Advanced Placement Courses divided into three different categories: AP Studio Art Drawing, AP Studio Art 2D Design, and AP Studio Art 3D Design.

Portfolio

Unlike traditional AP exams that utilize a multiple-choice section, free response section, and occasionally an audio section, the AP Studio Art Exam is a portfolio that encompasses 3 different categories: Quality, Concentration, and Breadth. Depending on the AP Studio Art exam the person is taking, the components for each of the 3 categories will vary.  Regardless of the exam, all AP Studio Art portfolios have to be turned in by a set date and time.

AP Studio Art Drawing

AP Studio Art Drawing is an advanced placement course that deals with basic painting and drawing. Focus is applied on the composition of the different lines/colors/shape/etc... of the painting instead of the design itself. Originally called AP Studio Art, it was later changed to AP Studio Art Drawing.

Portfolio

Section I: Quality: A student submits 5 actual artwork to the AP College Board that represent the student's quality of technique and their design concepts.
Section II: Concentration: A student submits 12 different slides that demonstrate the student's ability to paint and draw a variety of pieces that relate to 1 idea. These are arranged in a special order on slide coverings from College Board. Starting in 2009, an online application replaced the use of physical slides and associated documents.
Section III: Breadth: A student submits 12 additional and different slides that demonstrate the student's ability to incorporate drawing techniques and issues that include drawing from observation, work with inverted or nonobjective forms, effective use of light and shade, line quality, surface manipulation, composition, various spatial systems, and expressive mark-making. There are arranged similar to Section II.  Starting 2009, an online application replaced the use of physical slides and associated documents.

Grade distribution

In the 2016 administration, 18,407 students took the exam with 21 students earning a perfect score of 72/72.

AP Studio Art 2D

AP Studio Art 2D is an advanced placement course that is similar to AP Studio Art Drawing. It deals with two-dimensional applications such as graphic design, photography, weaving, and collage. Contrary to AP Studio Art Drawing, focus is applied on the design itself instead of the composition of the artwork.

Portfolio

Section I: Quality: A student submits 5 actual artwork that represents the student's quality of designing pieces in 2D.
Section II: Concentration: A student submits 125 different slides that demonstrate the student's ability to make a variety of pieces in 2D that relate to 1 idea. These are arranged in a special order on slide coverings from College Board. Starting in 2009, an online application replaced the use of physical slides and associated documents.
Section III: Breadth: A student submits 12 additional and different slides that demonstrate the student's ability to incorporate 2D design principles that include unity/variety, balance, emphasis, contrast, rhythm, repetition, proportion/scale, and figure-ground relationship. These are arranged similar to Section II. Starting 2009, an online application replaced the use of physical slides and associated documents.

Grade distribution

AP Studio Art 3D

AP Studio Art 3D is a three-dimensional Advanced Placement Studio Art course that holds many similarities to the AP Studio Art 2D course. The course deals with three-dimensional artistic applications such as metalworking, sculpture, model, and ceramics. Like AP Studio Art 2D, the focus is on the design of the artwork itself as opposed to its composition.

Portfolio

Section I: Quality: The actual work for this exam is three-dimensional and not flat, so transporting it directly to The College Board could cause damage to the artwork and the pieces would most likely not fit in portfolios. Because of this, five pieces of artwork are shown in ten slides to showcase the quality of the student's three-dimensional pieces.
Section II: Concentration: 12 different slides are submitted to demonstrate the student's ability to produce a variety of pieces that relate to a single idea. The slides are arranged in slide coverings in an order designated by The College Board. Starting in 2009, an online application replaced the use of physical slides and associated documents, and the student was allowed to determine the order of the works in their concentration.
Section III: Breadth: Eight different works are shown in 16 slides which are meant to demonstrate the student's ability to incorporate a variety of different 3D Design principles, including unity/variety, balance, emphasis, contrast, rhythm, repetition, proportion/scale, and figure/ground relationship. Similar to Section II, this section's slides are also arranged in an order designated by The College Board. Starting 2009, an online application replaced the use of physical slides and associated documents.

Grade distribution

In the 2012 administration, 3,840 students took the exam with a mean score of 3.00.

References

External links
 AP Studio Art at CollegeBoard.com
 AP Studio Art 2006 grade distribution

Advanced Placement
Visual arts education